Francis Agoda (born April 4, 1979), popularly known as I Go Dye<ref name="I GO DYE">{{cite web | url=http://www.vanguardngr.com/2014/09/go-dye-fabulous-lifestyle-comedian/ | title=I GO DYE:The fabulous lifestyle of a comedian | publisher=Vanduardngr.com | date=September 13, 2014 | accessdate=September 13, 2014 | archive-url=https://web.archive.org/web/20140914023618/http://www.vanguardngr.com/2014/09/go-dye-fabulous-lifestyle-comedian/ | archive-date=September 14, 2014 | url-status=live | df=dmy-all }}</ref> is a Nigerian comedian. He is a motivational speaker, writer and social crusader. He has organized several international comedy shows such as "I go Dye Standing."

Biography

Early life
Francis Agoda was born on April 4, 1979 in Abraka, Delta State, Nigeria.
As a young child, he grew up at Okpara water side with his grandmother, Queen Agnes, where he saw the numerous challenges facing rural settlements in Nigeria. This insight has motivated him to address some of these issues through his comedy and publications.
A review of his creativity dates back to his elementary school days at Ighogbadu Primary School, and College of Commerce, Warri Delta State. During his school days he was a member of the Junior Engineering Technical Society and was made the zonal project manager to represent Delta State. 
In 1992, as a young kid, he met the first executive governor of Delta State Olorogun Felix Ibru after he exhibited unusual creativity for someone who grew up in the village to have the innovation to design a hovercraft ship, radio transmitter, hair dryer, projector, electric solar table fan, and flying helicopter, that made him the first African child to have built a flying helicopter and a moving hovercraft ship. He was awarded a scholarship to study structural engineering at New York University.
His insight into the life and the future were mysterious according to his mother, Princess Emily because he professed issues about the future and he had a great inherent spirituality that made him scared.
Within a short while, his passion for comedy brought him wider acceptance and popularity, which he realized was a means to address mitigating factors affecting young children and many unprivileged people, based on what he witnessed growing up in the village as a young kid.

Career
He came up with the name I Go dye from the similarity of the sound of his surname Agoda, I GO DYE translated to mean initiative guide on developing youth endowment. His mother removed him from the United College of Commerce to Essi College, Warri, so that his uncle who was a teacher in that school could monitor his activities. While in Essi College, he joined SVC where he meet his best friend of today Otagware Onodjeyeke (Ltas) now known as Igosave, together they started presenting mock news on Delta Broadcasting Service 1994, where they addressed several issues affecting the society. Later on, he got a contract as a stand-up comedian at Prest Motel in Benin City where he was paid one thousand Naira per show. While he also expanded his profile across different events in Nigeria after years of exploring his creativity, he featured in Africa's biggest comedy show Night of A Thousand Laughs (2000 year edition) and he became the most salable comedian according to the marketer, Mr. Obino Music. He performed for a decade and he was eventually honored by the producer of Nite of a Thousand Laugh, Mr. Opa Williams as the most outstanding comedian to have been on the Night of a Thousand laugh stage for ten years.
 
His first European tour was with Ehi Zoya Golden Entertainment (2005), which took him around 7 countries. He was later contracted by France (NIDOE) to perform at the UNESCO Cultural Week in Paris, France, and was presented an award for his contribution to the upliftment of Nigeria's Cultural value by Niddo Spain.

He has been featured in the MTV Africa Music Awards. He has also performed in opening and closing shows of various notable musicians including Akon, Boyz II Men, 50-Cent, Rick Ross, The Game, and Kelly Rowland.

Awards
I Go Dye has won various awards, including:

 African Best Comedian.
 The Nigerians in Diaspora Organisation of Europe-SPAIN Award for his contribution to Nigerian culture and art.
 The Nigeria Best Comedian Award (NEA AWARD).
 Delta Role model Award 2017
 Nigeria best comedian Award
 Niddo Spain Award; for his contribution to Nigeria Culture and Art.
 Ukaid and youth alive foundation ambassador Award on #MadACT make a difference Against Corruption Today; dedicated to Nigeria pensioners
 Nigeria Army Civil Award with the complement of Chief of Army staff Lt General TY Buratai
 United Nations Development Goal Ambassador
 United Nations World Habitat Ambassador 
Other activities
I Go Dye personal comedy brand Igodye standing in 2016 Igodye sold out 02 London to mark his 20 years on stage, before Igodye standing world tour, Igodye has performed in African comedy events including MTV Africa Music Awards. Igodye as a prolific comedian has remained the toast of the comedy industry, entertaining Governors, Presidents, and diplomats. He also performed at the 2018 National Council of Nigeria Traditional Rulers, held in Port Harcourt with The Sultan of Sokoto, Alhaji Sa’ad Abubakar III, Ooni of Ife Adeyeye Enitan Ogunwusi, and many others.

He is a United Nations Millennium Development Goals Ambassador, working to actualize the United Nations' objectives.

In September 2014, he was photographed with the Cross River Governor Liyel Imoke at The Nigeria Ireland Carnival in Dublin.

Social crusader
I Go Dye as someone who had faced the ills of conflict and was shot, losing some of his close friends, that tragic experience changed his perception. When he reflected on the 1997 Warri crisis between the Ijaw and Itsekiri people, he championed the project, Peace in sight. Amb Francis Agoda'' shot a 10-minute documentary, a short film in 2004 for the United Nations and the Federal government of Nigeria to promote peace and advocate for rural development. He has often lent his voice and provided solutions to world leaders and Nigerian elites with most of his publications. His open letter to mark the United Nations Youth day in 2017 titled Logic and Reason without guns to Nigeria Government, Governors Militant and youth, he has continued to be an advocate for the African Youths, promoting a new political ideology that will include the youths in governance, he has also advocated for youth leadership, in Zimbabwe where he wrote president Robert Mugabe to step down for youthful leadership, he also advocated for youthful President in Liberia which has been successful and has continued to champion a new leadership also for Nigerian through his open letter to president Muhammadu Buhari and former vice president Atiku Abubakar.

References

1979 births
 Living people
 Entertainers from Delta State
 Nigerian male comedians
 People from Warri